The Hyphomicrobiaceae are a family of bacteria.  Among others, they include Rhodomicrobium, a genus of purple bacteria.

Phylogeny
The currently accepted taxonomy is based on the List of Prokaryotic names with Standing in Nomenclature (LPSN). The phylogeny is based on whole-genome analysis.

References

Hyphomicrobiales